Chris Hawkins (born April 12, 1986) is a former American football cornerback. He was originally signed as an undrafted free agent by the Jacksonville Jaguars on April 26, 2010, after the 2010 NFL Draft.

Hawkins has also been a member of the Tennessee Titans and the Philadelphia Eagles.

Early life
Hawkins was born and raised in Walker, Louisiana, where he attended high school at Walker High School.

External links
 Tennessee Titans bio

1986 births
Living people
People from Walker, Louisiana
Players of American football from Baton Rouge, Louisiana
American football cornerbacks
LSU Tigers football players
Jacksonville Jaguars players
Tennessee Titans players